Denys Viktorovych Oliynyk (born 16 June 1987) is a Ukrainian professional footballer who plays as a left winger for Vorskla Poltava.

Oliynyk also played for the Ukraine under-21 national team and the Ukraine senior team.

Club career

Dynamo Kyiv
Born in Zaporizhia, Ukrainian Soviet Socialist Republic, Oliynyk joined Dynamo Kyiv in 2004. There he was featured frequently in Dynamo-3, Dynamo-2 and the reserve squad of the main team. Although Oliynyk played two matches for Dynamo's senior squad in the 2006–07 season, he was not officially promoted to the main team until in May 2008 after the end of the 2007–08 season by new coach Yuri Semin.

Naftovyk-Ukrnafta Okhtyrka (loan)
For part of the 2007–08 season, Oliynyk was loaned to then-Ukrainian Premier League club Naftovyk-Ukrnafta Okhtyrka. He stayed there until the end of the 2007 calendar year.

Arsenal Kyiv (loan)
For the first half of the 2008–09 season, Oliynyk was loaned, alongside teammate Vitaliy Mandzyuk, to Arsenal Kyiv in July 2008. His time with Arsenal was extremely impressive as he quickly became one of the leaders of the midfield and attack.

Metalist Kharkiv
Seeking to strengthen his team for the 2008–09 UEFA Cup, Metalist Kharkiv coach Myron Markevych purchased Oliynyk during the winter transfer season. Oliynyk established himself in the squad and played in the UEFA Cup and in the Ukrainian Premier League.

Dnipro Dnipropetrovsk
In July 2011, Oliynyk changed club to join fellow Premier League side Dnipro Dnipropetrovsk.

Vitesse Arnhem
On 26 May 2014, Oliynyk signed a two-year contract at Dutch Eredivisie club Vitesse.

Darmstadt
On 9 August 2016, Oliynyk joined German Bundesliga side Darmstadt 98.

Personal life
His father Viktor Oliynyk is a legendary player of Bukovyna Chernivtsi. His godfather is another legendary Bukovyna Chernivtsi player Valeriy Korolyanchuk, whose son Andriy Korolyanchuk is also a football player. He is married, and has a son and a daughter, whose godfather is the famous Ukrainian football player Yevhen Konoplyanka.

Honours
SBV Vitesse
 Beloften Eredivisie: 2015

References

External links
 Information and foto by Denys Oliynyk at arsenal-kiev.com.ua
 Profile on official website of Metalist Kharkiv 
 
 

1987 births
Living people
Footballers from Zaporizhzhia
Ukrainian footballers
Ukraine youth international footballers
Ukraine under-21 international footballers
Ukraine international footballers
Association football wingers
FC Dynamo Kyiv players
FC Dynamo-3 Kyiv players
FC Dynamo-2 Kyiv players
FC Arsenal Kyiv players
FC Metalist Kharkiv players
FC Naftovyk-Ukrnafta Okhtyrka players
FC Dnipro players
SBV Vitesse players
SV Darmstadt 98 players
FC Desna Chernihiv players
FC Helios Kharkiv players
Seinäjoen Jalkapallokerho players
FC Vorskla Poltava players
Ukrainian Premier League players
Ukrainian First League players
Ukrainian Second League players
Eredivisie players
Bundesliga players
Veikkausliiga players
Ukrainian expatriate footballers
Expatriate footballers in the Netherlands
Ukrainian expatriate sportspeople in the Netherlands
Expatriate footballers in Germany
Ukrainian expatriate sportspeople in Germany
Expatriate footballers in Finland
Ukrainian expatriate sportspeople in Finland